= Walgrove, West Virginia =

Unincorporated community in West Virginia, US

Coordinates: 38°27′50″N 81°26′13″W

Walgrove is an unincorporated community in Kanawha County, in the U.S. state of West Virginia.

== History ==
A post office called Walgrove was established in 1917, and remained in operation until 1937. The community was named for a grove of walnut trees near the original town site.
